Jean Debuf (31 May 1924 – 6 October 2010) was a French weightlifter.

He was born in Bousbecque. He won a bronze medal in the middle heavyweight division at the 1956 Summer Olympics in Melbourne. At the 1948 Summer Olympics he placed fourth in the light heavyweight division, and at the 1952 Summer Olympics he placed fifth.

References

1924 births
2010 deaths
French male weightlifters
Weightlifters at the 1948 Summer Olympics
Weightlifters at the 1952 Summer Olympics
Weightlifters at the 1956 Summer Olympics
Weightlifters at the 1960 Summer Olympics
Olympic weightlifters of France
Olympic bronze medalists for France
Olympic medalists in weightlifting
Medalists at the 1956 Summer Olympics